Lefty Johnson may refer to:

 Lefty Johnson (outfielder) (1862–1942), Major League Baseball outfielder
 Lefty Johnson (pitcher), Negro league baseball player